The First cabinet of Lars Løkke Rasmussen, was announced on 5 April 2009 as Lars Løkke became prime minister after Anders Fogh Rasmussen was offered the post of Secretary General of NATO on 4 April 2009.

Following the 2011 parliamentary election, Lars Løkke Rasmussen was replaced as Prime Minister of Denmark by the Social Democrat Helle Thorning-Schmidt.

Changes from the cabinet of Anders Fogh Rasmussen III
On 7 April 2009 Lars Løkke Rasmussen announced the following changes from the cabinet of Anders Fogh Rasmussen III: Claus Hjort Frederiksen became Minister of Finance after Lars Løkke Rasmussen, and Frederiksen's previous post of Minister of Employment is filled by Inger Støjberg, previously not a minister, who also becomes Minister for Equal Rights. Following Karen Jespersen's announcement that she wished to withdraw as Minister for Social Welfare, that ministry is abolished and a new combined ministry of the interior and of social affairs is taken over by Karen Ellemann.

On 23 February 2010 Løkke Rasmussen announced a major reshuffle, which affected all ministers except for Claus Hjort Frederiksen, Birthe Rønn Hornbech and the prime minister himself.

On 8 March 2011 some minor changes were announced in connection with the firing of Birthe Rønn Hornbech from her position as Minister for Integration as a result of a scandal involving the right of citizenship for stateless residents.

List of ministers and portfolios
Some periods in the table below start before April 2009 because the ministers were also in the Cabinet of Anders Fogh Rasmussen I, II and III.

|}

Notes

Rasmussen, Lars Lokke
2009 establishments in Denmark
2011 disestablishments in Denmark
Cabinets established in 2009
Cabinets disestablished in 2011